Kiiwetinoong is a provincial electoral district (riding) in Ontario, Canada which elects one member to the Legislative Assembly of Ontario. This riding was created prior to the 42nd Ontario general election from the northern portion of Kenora—Rainy River on the advice of the Far North Electoral Boundaries Commission in 2017. The Legislative Assembly of Ontario approved the new riding on October 24, 2017.

Kiiwetinoong is 68 percent Indigenous, the only riding in Ontario with a majority Indigenous population. The riding name means "North" in Ojibwe.

Unlike most Ontario provincial districts, Kiiwetinoong does not have the same boundaries as a federal district.  As well, the riding, with a population of 32,987, is significantly smaller than the average Ontario district (with a population of 110,000) or the average Northern Ontario district (with a population of 76,000).  Josh Dehaas, a National Post columnist, has criticized the new riding as violating the principle of representation by population.

Members of Provincial Parliament

Election results

References

External links 
Map of riding for 2018 election

Ontario provincial electoral districts
Sioux Lookout